Guozhou or Guo Prefecture was a zhou (prefecture) in imperial China, centering on modern Sanmenxia, Henan, China. It existed (intermittently) from 583 until 1271.

Geography
The administrative region of Guozhou in the Tang dynasty is in modern Sanmenxia in western Henan on the border with Shaanxi. It probably includes parts of modern: 
Lingbao City
Lushi County

References
 

Prefectures of the Sui dynasty
Prefectures of the Tang dynasty
Prefectures of the Song dynasty
Prefectures of Later Liang (Five Dynasties)
Prefectures of Later Tang
Prefectures of Later Jin (Five Dynasties)
Prefectures of Later Han (Five Dynasties)
Prefectures of Later Zhou
Prefectures of the Jin dynasty (1115–1234)
Prefectures of the Yuan dynasty
Former prefectures in Henan